Edward Collins may refer to:

Edward Collins (Australian politician) (1866–1936), New South Wales politician
Edward Collins (figure skater), Canadian figure skater
Edward Collins (Irish politician) (1941–2019), Irish Fine Gael politician
Edward Collins (rugby league), Australian international rugby league footballer, played for Norths Devils
Edward Collins (Wisconsin politician), served one year as a member of the Wisconsin State Assembly
Edward J. Collins Jr. (died 2007), Massachusetts civil servant and public manager
Edward Joseph Collins (1886–1951), American pianist, conductor and composer of romantic classical music
Edward Knight Collins (1802–1878), American shipping magnate
Edward Treacher Collins (1862–1932), English surgeon and ophthalmologist

See also
Ed Collins (disambiguation)
Eddie Collins (disambiguation)
Ted Collins (disambiguation)